This is a list of episodes for the anime and drama adaptations of the manga series Gokusen.

Episode list

Drama

Gokusen (2002)

Gokusen 2 (2005)

Gokusen 3 (2008)

Gokusen: The Movie (2009)

The Gokusen (2004 anime)

References

Gokusen